The women's doubles tennis event of the 2011 Pan American Games was held on October 18–21 at the Telcel Tennis Complex in Guadalajara. The defending Pan American Games champions were Jorgelina Cravero and Betina Jozami of Argentina.

Seeds

Draw

Finals

Top half

Bottom half

References

Tennis at the 2011 Pan American Games